Domenico Piò (1715-1801) was an Italian sculptor, active in Bologna in a late-Rococo style.

Biography
He was born in Bologna and learned his trade and style from working with his father, Angelo Piò. He became secretary of the Accademia Clementina. Among Domenico's pupils was Gaetano Pignoni.

References

1715 births
1801 deaths
18th-century Italian sculptors
Italian male sculptors
Artists from Bologna
18th-century Italian male artists